The Gateless Barrier (Mandarin: 無門關 Wúménguān; Japanese: 無門関 Mumonkan), sometimes translated as The Gateless Gate, is a collection of 48 Chan (Zen) koans compiled in the early 13th century by the Chinese Zen master Wumen Huikai (無門慧開; Japanese: Mumon Ekai; 1183–1260). The title has a double meaning and can also be understood as Wumen's Barrier; the compiler's name, which literally means "No Gate", is the same as the title's first two characters. Wumen's preface indicates that the volume was published in 1228. Each koan is accompanied by a commentary and verse by Wumen. A classic edition includes a 49th case composed by Anwan (pen name for Cheng Ch'ing-Chih) in 1246. Wu-liang Tsung-shou also supplemented the volume with a verse of four stanzas composed in 1230 about the three checkpoints of Zen master Huanglong.  These three checkpoints of Huanglong should not be confused with Doushuai's Three Checkpoints found in Case 47.

Along with the Blue Cliff Record and the oral tradition of Hakuin Ekaku, The Gateless Gate is a central work much used in Rinzai School practice. Five of the koans in the work concern the sayings and doings of Zhaozhou; four concern Ummon.

The common theme of the koans of the Wumen Guan and of Wumen's comments is the inquiry and introspection of dualistic conceptualization. Each koan epitomizes one or more of the polarities of consciousness that act like an obstacle or wall to the insight. The student is challenged to transcend the polarity that the koan represents and demonstrate or show that transcendence to the Zen teacher.

Structure and contents 
The text was originally prepared by Wumen as a record of his teaching during a monastic training period held at Longxiang (Soaring Dragon) monastery in the summer of 1228.  Wumen selected the 48 koans and commented on and added a verse for each koan.  His teachings were transcribed and after the training period were compiled into the collection called the Wumen Guan.

As was customary in China at the time, an edition might have additions of text inserted by a subsequent owner or publisher. The most well known version of the text is from the Japanese wood block edition made from the 1246 manuscript edition that contains the following sections.

 An untitled introduction by Xi Xiang (習巷), publisher of the 1228 edition, written in the self-deprecating style of Zen humor.
 An untitled dedication by Wumen to the Emperor and Empress. Works without such dedications were subject to Imperial censorship as being seditious.
 An untitled foreword by Wumen followed by a verse on the title.
 A table of contents with the title of each koan. However, the koans are unnumbered in both the table of contents and the body of the text and there are no page numbers in the text, so the table of contents is the list of the koan's titles in order of appearance.
 The 48 koans presented in four parts consisting of (1) a title composed of four characters, (2) the body of the koan beginning with the name of the protagonist of the case, (3) a comment beginning with the words "Wumen says" (無門曰), and a verse beginning with the words "The ode says" (頌曰).
 An untitled afterword by Wumen that ends with the words "The end of the volume the Gateless Checkpoint."
 An appendix believed to be written by Wumen titled "Zen Caveats" or "Zen Warnings"" consisting of twelve one-line aphorisms about Zen practice written in the style of Zen contrariness that points to not falling for either side of dualistic thinking. For example, Zen is known as the school of Buddhism that does not stand on written words and one caveat says, "Neglecting the written records with unrestrained ideas is falling into a deep pit."
 An appendix titled "Huanglong's Three Checkpoints" (黄龍三關) written by Wuliang Zongshou (無量宗壽) in the late spring of 1230 C.E.. Huanglong Huinan (J. Oryo Enan), 1002–1069. was a Zen master who promulgated three questions as one-line koans: "Everyone exists by a particular cause of birth. What is your cause of birth?" "How is my hand like the hand of Buddha?" "How is my leg like the leg of a donkey?"  Wulaing wrote four four-line stanzas (Sanskrit gathas).  Each of the first three stanzas comments on one of Huanglong's three questions and the fourth stanza is a summation.  Wulaing writes that he penned the four verses to thank and commemorate Wumen's recent stay at Ruiyan (瑞巖)(Lucky Cliff) monastery where Wumen was the visiting head teacher for the training period.
 A short untitled addendum by Wuan written on the republishing of the work in the summer of 1245 C.E. Wuan called his brief addition the 49th case. It referred to Bodhidharma's famous Zen motto: "Not maintaining written words, but pointing directly to the human heart-mind to see one's own nature to become Buddha".
 An undated postscript by Menggong (孟拱) consisting of a very brief story of a military ambassador who used his army as farmers to reclaim a wasteland and thus pacify the region. This appears to be a metaphor for the practice of Zen.
 An appendix by Anwan dated the beginning of summer 1246, presented in the same format as one of the 48 main koans and consisting of (1) an untitled introduction, (2) a title, "Younger Brother's 49th Standard Talk", (3) the body of the case, (4) a comment beginning with "Anwan says", and (5) a verse beginning with "The ode says", followed by Anwan's signature with the place and date of the writing.

Zen Caveats
The Wumen Guan has an appendix titled "Zen Caveats" (禪箴) with one-line aphorisms dealing with Zen practice  The word zhēn (箴) means "caveat", "warning", or "admonition", but it also has the meaning of "needle" or "probe" (as in acupuncture needles) and is sometimes translated as "Zen Needles".  As with the main koans, each caveat challenges the Zen student's attachment to dualistic concepts, here those especially related to Zen practice.

 Following the rules and protecting the regulations is binding oneself without rope.

 Moving freely vertically and horizontally without obstruction is the way of outsiders and the nightmare army.

 To preserve the heart mind and to purify it by letting impurities settle to the bottom in quiescence is the perverted Zen of silent illumination.

 Neglecting the written records with unrestrained ideas is falling into a deep pit.

 To be awake and not ignorant is to wear chains and shoulder a cangue.

 Thinking good and thinking evil are the halls of heaven and hell.

 A view of Buddha and a view of Dharma are the two enclosing mountains of iron.

 A person who perceives thoughts as they immediately arise is fiddling with spectral consciousness.

 However, being on a high plateau practicing samadhi is the stratagem of living in the house of ghosts.

 To advance results in ignoring truth; to retreat results in contradicting the lineage.

 Neither to advance nor to retreat is being a breathing corpse.

 Just say, how will you walk?

 You must work hard to live in the present and, to finish, all the more. I do not advise the unfortunate excess of continual suffering.

See also
101 Zen Stories
Book of Equanimity
The Gateless Gate at wikisource

References

External links

The (incomplete) Gateless Gate at ibiblio (archived from the original on 2020-12-27)
The (complete) Gateless Gate at Awakening 101
About the Wu-Men Kuan koans edited by Dr. T. Matthes Ciolek; includes links to English-language commentaries on some of the koans, and a bibliography of print materials
The Gateless Gate at sacred-texts.com, including Chinese original
The Gateless Gate in original Chinese at the Chinese Buddhist Electronic Text Association (CBeta), in traditional Chinese characters, as recorded in the Buddhist canon.
The Gateless Checkpoint of the Zen Lineage a complete translation of the 1246 CE manuscript including fore and after appended sections.
An Analysis Of The Koans In The Mu Mon Kwan by John F. Fisher, Northwestern University, Numen, Vol. 25, Fasc. 1. (Apr., 1978), pp. 65–76.
The Gateless Gate (1998) – translated by Eiichi Shimomissé

Zen koan collections
1228 works